TATA-binding protein-associated factor 172 is a protein that in humans is encoded by the BTAF1 gene.

Function 

Initiation of transcription by RNA polymerase II requires the assistance of TATA box-binding protein (TBP; MIM 600075) and TBP-associated factors, or TAFs (e.g., TAF2B; MIM 604912), in 2 distinct complexes, TFIID and B-TFIID. The TFIID complex is composed of TBP and more than 8 TAFs. However, the majority of TBP is present in the B-TFIID complex, which is composed of TBP and TAFII170, also called TAF172, and has DNA-dependent ATPase activity.[supplied by OMIM]

Interactions 

BTAF1 has been shown to interact with TATA binding protein.

References

External links

Further reading